Eriosyce is a genus of cacti native to Chile.

Description
They are spherical to cylindrical plants that rarely sprout. The plants reach heights of growth of up to 1 m and have a diameter of up to 50 cm. They form 7 to 30 ribs on which the thorn-bearing areoles sit. The ribs are deepened between the areoles. The flowers usually appear near the apex, are funnel-shaped and yellow to red in color. The fruits are hollow, often woolly berries, in which the seed is usually loose. The berries often tear open at the base. The seeds are 0.7 to 3 mm long.

Species
, Plants of the World Online accepts the following species:

Synonymy
The following genera have been brought into synonymy with Eriosyce:

Chilenia Backeb.
Chileniopsis Backeb.
Chileocactus Frič
Chileorebutia F.Ritter
Chiliorebutia Frič (orth. var.)
Delaetia Backeb.
Dracocactus Y.Itô
Euporteria Kreuz. & Buining
Friesia Frič ex Kreuz.
Hildmannia Kreuz. & Buining
Horridocactus Backeb.
Islaya Backeb.
Neochilenia Backeb.
Neoporteria Britton & Rose
Neotanahashia Y.Itô
Netanahashia Y.Itô
Nichelia Bullock
Pyrrhocactus A.Berger
Rimacactus Mottram
Rodentiophila F.Ritter & Y.Itô
Thelocephala Y.Itô

References

External links

Cactoideae genera
Notocacteae